Kevin Matthews may refer to:
 Kevin Matthews (writer) (1911-1968), pseudonym of the American writer Gardner F. Fox
 Kevin Matthews (radio personality) (born 1956), American  radio personality
 Kevin Matthews (politician) (born 1960), American politician in Oklahoma
 Kevin Matthews (wrestler) (born 1983), American professional wrestler
 Kevin Matthews (American football) (born 1987), American football center

See also
 Kevin Mathews (born 1961), Singaporean singer-songwriter